is a railway station on the Tobu Skytree Line in Sumida, Tokyo, Japan, operated by the private railway operator Tobu Railway. It is adjacent to the Tokyo Skytree and Skytree Town redevelopment, and was formerly known as Narihirabashi Station.

Lines

Station layout
The station consists of one island platform serving two tracks.

Platforms

Adjacent stations
All kinds of the limited express excluding Skytree Liner and Urban Park Liner stop at Hikifune Station as the next or previous station at only the morning and evening. At the noon, all of the limited express except Skytree Liner and Urban Park Liner stop at Kita-Senju Station as the next or previous station.

History

The station closed from 5 April 1904, but reopened on 1 March 1908. On 1 March 1910, the station was renamed . On 25 May 1931, this was renamed .

Redevelopment and renaming
Narihirabashi Station was renamed Tokyo Skytree Station from 17 March 2012, ahead of the opening of the Tokyo Skytree and adjoining Skytree Town shopping and office complex on 22 May 2012. From this date, all up limited express (Spacia, Ryōmō, and Shimotsuke) services and four down Spacia Kinu services stop at the station. The rebuilt and enlarged station was opened on 20 April 2012, with the concourse area increased from approximately 60 m2 to 700 m2.

From the same day, station numbering was introduced on all Tobu lines, with Tokyo Skytree Station becoming "TS-02".

From 26 or 27 November 2022, a new elevated platform will open for southbound trains headed for Asakusa Station.

Passenger statistics
In fiscal 2012, the station was used by an average of 105,199 passengers daily.

Surrounding area
 Tokyo Skytree
 Sumida Aquarium
 Tobu Railway Head Office

Other stations
 Oshiage Station ( Tokyo Metro Hanzōmon Line) (approximately 10 minutes' walk and 1 stop away on the railway)
 Honjo-azumabashi Station ( Toei Asakusa Line)

See also
 List of railway stations in Japan

References

External links

 Tobu station information 

Tobu Skytree Line
Stations of Tobu Railway
Railway stations in Tokyo
Railway stations in Japan opened in 1902